Peregrins is an album by the alternative rock band Peregrins. It was released in 1989 via MCA, and is their only album.

Critical reception
The album drew mostly positive reviews.  Tom Moon, the critic for The Philadelphia Inquirer at the time, gave the album 2.5 stars out of four, writing that it is "slightly rough, slightly coy, slightly maniacal pop-rock, without the quirks or lyrical complexity of 10,000 Maniacs." Rodger Mullen, in The Fayetteville Observer, called it "a sometimes-rocking, sometimes-reflective set of songs distinguished mainly by the soaring vocals of Diedre Steinschneider."

Track listing
 "Let It Go"
 "Always Tomorrow"
 "True Believer"
 "History of the World" 
 "Innocent Eyes"
 "Broken Man" 
 "Peace of Mind"
 "Passers By"
 "It's a Word"
 "Empty Air"
 "Tall Tale"

Personnel
Peregrins
Deirdre Steinschneider - vocals
Jeffrey Dresher - guitar
Eve Moon - guitar, background vocals
Fred Smith - bass
Julius Klepacz - drums
with:
Bob Kinkel - organ on "Peace of Mind" and "Tall Tale"
Bob Marlett - piano on "History of the World"
Harold Payne - backing vocals on "Always Tomorrow"

Release Information
MCA 6288.  Released in 1989.

References

1989 debut albums
MCA Records albums
Albums produced by David Kershenbaum